The Round (also known as The Round at Beaverton Central) is a mixed-use development surrounding the Beaverton Central station in Beaverton, Oregon, United States. Nearby features include BG's Food Cartel and the Patricia Reser Center for the Arts.

References

External links

 

Beaverton, Oregon
Mixed-use developments in the United States